Jarvis Diallo Johnson (born September 27, 1971) is an elected official currently holding office as a Democratic member of the Texas House of Representatives. He has represented the 139th District since 2016.

Johnson succeeded Sylvester Turner, who stepped down to serve as Mayor of Houston. He is a former District B District Council Member that served the term limit, three terms, in the city of Houston, Texas.

Early years and career
Johnson grew up in Houston's Fifth Ward. During his early teens, he and his sister Velika became two of the founding members of the Mickey Leland Youth Task Forces (MLYTF).

Johnson graduated with a B.A. from  Texas Southern University. While in college, he became executive director of Phoenix Outreach Youth Center in 1995. Johnson resigned this position in 2008 to focus his efforts on District B as a full-time city council member.

Johnson is the owner of Aunt Bea's Restaurant, co-owner of two daycares in Houston, and president of Commagere International Consultant Group.

Political career

Houston City Council (2005–2009)

In 2005, Johnson ran for Houston City Council District B, a seat held by term limited Carol M. Galloway. In an eight candidate race, Johnson received nearly 4,000 votes, earning a spot in the December run off election. In December 2005, Johnson won the Houston City Council District B race by over 60% of the vote. He was subsequently re-elected to a second and third term.

Johnson served as chair of the City of Houston's Human Services and Technology Access Committee. Johnson also served on the Houston City Council Flooding and Drainage, Housing and Community Development, International Liaison and Protocol, M/WBE, Small Contractor Development and Contract Compliance, Pension Review, Public Safety and Homeland Security, Regulation, Development, Neighborhood Protection and Transportation, Infrastructure & Aviation committees.

2010 U.S. House of Representatives campaign
On January 5, 2010, Johnson announced his candidacy for Texas's 18th Congressional District seat, a seat held by incumbent Sheila Jackson Lee.

Jackson Lee was in her third term on the Houston City Council in 1994 when she beat incumbent U.S. Representative Craig Washington on the theme that he was out of touch with his district. When Johnson announced his candidacy in 2010, he had just won a third term to a council seat within the 18th Congressional District. The congressional district encompasses much of urban Houston and is about 40% black with the remainder split between whites and Hispanics. It accounts for about a quarter of the city's more than 2 million residents.

Texas Legislature (2016–Present)
Johnson ran in the 2016 primary election, advanced to the runoff election, and won a special election called to determine an interim representative for 2016 and won the primary election runoff. Since he was unopposed in November 2016, Johnson winning the special election and runoff meant he was the District 139 state representative who would succeed Sylvester Turner. After 26 years, Turner stepped down from his state seat to become Houston's mayor.

Johnson won the May 7 special election, with 85% of the vote, to finish out the remainder of Turner's term as state representative of District 139. Turner swore him in, allowing Johnson to serve through December and immediately, fully assume former Turner's seniority status and his roles that include vice-chairman of the House Appropriations Committee.

Electoral history

2005

2007

2009

References

External links
 Jarvis Johnson at the Texas Tribune
 Jarvis Johnson's official website
 

African-American state legislators in Texas
Democratic Party members of the Texas House of Representatives
Texas Southern University alumni
Houston City Council members
1971 births
Living people
21st-century American politicians
21st-century African-American politicians
20th-century African-American people